The RML Short Wheelbase is a grand tourer produced by the RML Group.

History
The Short Wheelbase, designed as a coupé, was presented in May 2021 after around three years of development. Series production of the vehicle, which is limited to 30 examples, is scheduled to begin at the end of 2021.

The model is reminiscent of the Ferrari 250 GT SWB built between 1959 and 1962 with 167 copies built. The design takes up numerous elements of the Ferrari. Among other things, the shape of the radiator grille, the missing bumpers or the air scoop in the bonnet are design elements that Ferrari also used. However, the multi-spoke wheels does not have wing nuts. The Short Wheelbase also does not use any plastic in the interior. Instead, aluminum, glass and leather are used. In contrast to the 250 GT SWB, the car has air conditioning and a navigation system, which can be lowered into the center console.

Specifications
Technically, the Short Wheelbase is based on the Ferrari 550 Maranello built between 1996 and 2001. It is equipped with a 5.5-liter V12 naturally aspirated engine with 357 kW (485 hp).

References

External links
 RML Short Wheelbase

Grand tourers
Rear-wheel-drive vehicles
Cars introduced in 2021